The following are protected federal lands in the U.S. state of Washington:

National Parks 
There are three National Park within the state of Washington:

 Olympic National Park near Port Angeles
 Mount Rainier National Park near Tacoma
 North Cascades National Park near Sedro Woolley

National Monuments 
The three National Monuments in the state of Washington are:

 Mount St. Helens National Volcanic Monument near Castle Rock
 Hanford Reach National Monument near Richland
 San Juan Islands National Monument near Friday Harbor

National Recreational Areas 
The three National Recreation Areas within the state of Washington are:

 Lake Chelan National Recreation Area near Chelan
 Lake Roosevelt National Recreation Area near Spokane
 Ross Lake National Recreation Area near Newhalem

National Historic Sites 
The two National Historic Sites within the state of Washington are:

 Fort Vancouver National Historic Site near Vancouver
 Whitman Mission National Historic Site near Walla Walla

National Scenic Areas 
The single National Scenic Area in the state of Washington is:

 Columbia River Gorge

National Forests 
The eight National Forests within the state of Washington are:

 Colville National Forest
 Gifford Pinchot National Forest
 Idaho Panhandle National Forest
 Kaniksu National Forest
 Mount Baker–Snoqualmie National Forest
 Okanogan–Wenatchee National Forest
 Olympic National Forest
 Umatilla National Forest

Note: the Okanogan and Wenatchee National Forests were formerly two separate National Forests that are now managed as one by the US Forest Service.

National Wildlife Refuges 
There are 23 National Wildlife Refuges are located in the state of Washington including:

 Dungeness National Wildlife Refuge
 Little Pend Oreille National Wildlife Refuge
 Nisqually National Wildlife Refuge
 Ridgefield National Wildlife Refuge
 Saddle Mountain National Wildlife Refuge
 San Juan Islands National Wildlife Refuge
 Turnbull National Wildlife Refuge
 Willapa National Wildlife Refuge

See also 
List of Washington state parks
List of National Register of Historic Places in Washington

References 

Washington (state) geography-related lists
Protected areas of Washington (state)
Tourist attractions in Washington (state)